Heinrich Beisenherz (1891 – 1977) was a German art director and painter.

Selected filmography
 Downfall (1923)
 The Secret of Brinkenhof (1923)
 The Love of a Queen (1923)
 Garragan (1924)
 Anna and Elizabeth (1933)
 Police Report (1939)
 Hurrah! I'm a Father (1939)
 Mask in Blue (1943)
 The Roedern Affair (1944)
 Free Land (1946)
 Thank You, I'm Fine (1948)
 King for One Night (1950)
 Fritz and Friederike (1952)
 The Silent Angel (1954)
 The Dark Star (1955)

References

Bibliography 
 Giesen, Rolf. Nazi Propaganda Films: A History and Filmography. McFarland & Company, 2003.

External links 
 

Artists from Dortmund
1891 births
1977 deaths
German art directors
20th-century German painters
20th-century German male artists
Film people from North Rhine-Westphalia